Whitefish Bay is a large bay on the eastern end of Lake Superior.

It can also refer to:

Places
 Whitefish Bay, Wisconsin, a village in the United States
 Whitefish Bay High School
 Whitefish Bay, Door County, Wisconsin, a community in the United States
 Whitefish Bay, Ontario, a community in the Lac Seul 28 Indian reserve of the Lac Seul First Nation
 First Nations reserves in northwestern Ontario, Canada:
 Whitefish Bay 32A
 Whitefish Bay 33A
 Whitefish Bay 34A

Other
 Whitefish Bay (2013 ship)
 Naotkamegwanning First Nation, formerly known as Whitefish Bay First Nation, an Ojibwa First Nation in Kenora District, Ontario, Canada

See also
 Whitefish (disambiguation)